The Ragamuffin is a 1916 American silent drama film directed and written by William C. deMille. The film stars Blanche Sweet in a 'Pickfordish' style role.

Cast
 Blanche Sweet - Jenny
 Tom Forman - Bob Van Dyke
 Minnette Barrett - Beth, His Sister
 Mrs. Lewis McCord - Mary
 Parks Jones - Jack Dexter 
 James Neill - A Broker
 William Elmer - Kelly
 Agnes de Mille - Jenny, as a child

See also
Blanche Sweet filmography

Preservation status
 A copy is preserved in the George Eastman Museum.

References

External links
 
 
Still production photos

1916 films
1916 drama films
Silent American drama films
American silent feature films
American black-and-white films
Famous Players-Lasky films
Films directed by William C. deMille
Paramount Pictures films
1910s American films